Semiahmoo Bay is the southeastern section of Boundary Bay on the Pacific coast of North America. The bay is named for the  Semiahmoo First Nation, who originally occupied the area. The Semiahmoo Peninsula borders the bay and was home to cannery operations. It is now home to the Semiahmoo Golf Resort.

From the north to south, the following communities and places are located on its shore:
 North of the  border, in British Columbia:
 the Crescent Beach and Ocean Park neighbourhoods of the city of Surrey
 the city of White Rock
 the Semiahmoo Indian Reserve of the Semiahmoo First Nation
 Peace Arch Provincial Park
 South of the border, in Washington State:
 Peace Arch State Park
 Blaine

Blaine's Drayton Harbor opens into Semiahmoo Bay; the harbor is separated from the main body of the bay by Semiahmoo Spit. The Semiahmoo Resort is located south of the spit.

The Washington State Department of Ecology classified the marine waters within Semiahmoo Bay, outside of Drayton Harbor, as extraordinary quality waters for (1) salmonid and other fish migration, rearing, and spawning; (2) clam, oyster, and mussel rearing and spawning; and (3) crustaceans and other shellfish (crabs, shrimp, crayfish, and scallops) rearing and spawning.

The Campbell River flows into Semiahmoo Bay on the Canadian side; California Creek and Dakota Creek flow into Drayton Harbor on the US side.

External links 

Birds on the Bay, by  Friends of Semiahmoo Bay Society

Bays of British Columbia
Bays of Washington (state)
Landforms of Lower Mainland
Surrey, British Columbia
Bodies of water of Whatcom County, Washington
White Rock, British Columbia
Washington placenames of Native American origin